"Whiskey Girl" is a song co-written and recorded by American country music singer Toby Keith. It was released in March 2004 as the third and final single from his 2003 album Shock'n Y'all. The song reached number one on the US Billboard Hot Country Singles & Tracks chart in July 2004. A live version is included on the deluxe edition of his 2012 album Hope on the Rocks. Keith wrote this song with Scotty Emerick.

Content
The song's narrator describes his girlfriend as his "little whiskey girl." In the video she is the object of fantasy for a mechanic at an autoshop Keith is visiting. According to Scotty Emerick, the little whiskey girl is "the epitome of a redneck girl who ain't into wine and beer or tequila".

Music video
Amy Weber, a WWE Diva, appeared in the music video, which was directed by Michael Salomon. The video premiered on CMT on March 27, 2004 during CMT 3rd Shift. In the music video, Weber was in an auto mechanic suit, and then, she took off her auto mechanic mask, and suit, and her belly button was shown attached by piercing jewelry, and then she goes with a man to a bar, and giving her a bottle of whiskey.

Chart performance
"Whiskey Girl" debuted at number 59 on the U.S. Billboard Hot Country Singles & Tracks for the week of March 20, 2004.

Year-end charts

References

2004 singles
Toby Keith songs
Songs written by Scotty Emerick
Songs written by Toby Keith
Song recordings produced by James Stroud
Songs about alcohol
DreamWorks Records singles
Music videos directed by Michael Salomon
2003 songs